Maryland has a number of major and minor professional sports franchises. Two National Football League teams play in Maryland, the Baltimore Ravens in Baltimore and the Washington Commanders in Prince George's County. The Baltimore Orioles compete as Major League Baseball franchise in Baltimore.

Other professional sports franchises in the state include five affiliated minor league baseball teams, one independent league baseball team, the Baltimore Blast indoor soccer team, two indoor football teams, two low-level Basketball teams, three low-level outdoor soccer teams and the Chesapeake Bayhawks of Major League Lacrosse.

The Congressional Country Club has hosted several professional golf tournaments, including the U.S. Open, PGA Championship, U.S. Senior Open, Senior PGA Championship, Kemper Open and Quicken Loans National.

Maryland has had famous athletes including baseball's Al Kaline of the Detroit Tigers, Orioles' Cal Ripken Jr. and George Herman ("Babe") Ruth, who played for the old Orioles, Boston Red Sox, and especially won fame with the New York Yankees. Plus Olympic swimming medalists Michael Phelps and Katie Hoff.Since 1962, the official state sport of Maryland is jousting. Lacrosse was named the official team sport in 2004, and Sports Illustrated wrote the sport "has always been the showcase for the flower of Maryland manhood." In 2008, intending to promote physical fitness for all ages, Maryland declared walking the official state exercise and became the first state with an official state exercise.

Major professional teams

Maryland has major professional sports teams in the city of Baltimore and in the Maryland suburbs of Washington, D.C.. Two major league teams play in Baltimore — the NFL's Baltimore Ravens and MLB's Baltimore Orioles. Additionally, the NFL's Baltimore Colts played in Baltimore from 1953 to 1983 before moving to Indianapolis.

The Washington Commanders (formerly the Washington Redskins) play in Landover, Maryland. The NHL's Washington Capitals and the NBA's Washington Wizards (formerly the Baltimore Bullets, then Washington Bullets) used to play in Maryland before moving in 1997 to a newly constructed Verizon Center arena in downtown Washington in the District of Columbia.

Other current professional and semi-pro teams

Baseball

Basketball

Football

Hockey

Soccer

Former professional and semi-pro teams

Baseball
The following table details baseball teams which were located in Maryland.  For minor league teams that changed affiliations, each affiliation is listed as a separate team.

Basketball

Football

Hockey

Inline Hockey

Lacrosse

Soccer

Other sports

Collegiate sports

NCAA Division I

Coppin State University

The Coppin State University sports teams participate in NCAA Division I as a member of the Mid-Eastern Athletic Conference (MEAC) for most sports, with baseball competing in the Northeast Conference (NEC).  Its teams are called the Eagles.

Johns Hopkins University

The Johns Hopkins Blue Jays men's lacrosse team, founded in 1883, is the school's most prominent sports team, which has won 44 national titles. The Blue Jays play at Homewood Field (pictured right). Lacrosse is the only sport in which Hopkins participates as an NCAA Division I member; both the men's and women's lacrosse teams compete at that level in the Big Ten Conference. All other Hopkins sports compete in NCAA Division III, in which athletic scholarships are not allowed. Hopkins is one of a small number of Division III schools authorized by the NCAA to continue awarding scholarships in their Division I sports.

Loyola University Maryland

Loyola fields 17 varsity teams and 22 club teams. The varsity teams, known as the Greyhounds, participate in the NCAA's Division I. All Loyola varsity teams compete in the Patriot League in the following sports:

Morgan State University

The Morgan State University athletic teams are members of the Mid-Eastern Athletic Conference.  Their teams are called the Bears and compete in the following sports:
Basketball – Men's & Women's
Bowling – Women's
Cheer – Women's
Cross Country – Men's & Women's
Football – Men's
Softball – Women's
Tennis – Men's & Women's
Track & Field – Women's
Volleyball – Women's

Mount St. Mary's University
Mount St. Mary's University was one of the founding members of the Northeast Conference, but moved in 2022 to the Metro Atlantic Athletic Conference.  The school's sports teams are called the Mountaineers and compete in the following sports:
Baseball – Men's
Basketball – Men's & Women's
Cross Country – Men's & Women's
Lacrosse – Men's
Softball – Women's
Soccer – Men's & women's
Swimming – Women's
Tennis – Men's & Women's
Track & Field (Indoor and Outdoor) – Men's & Women's
Water Polo - Men's & Women

Towson University

The athletics teams of Towson University participate in the NCAA's Division I and are members of the Colonial Athletic Association, as well as CAA Football, the technically separate football league operated by that conference. Some sports compete in the Eastern College Athletic Conference. The school's sports teams are called the Tigers, and the mascot of the University is named Doc.

United States Naval Academy

The United States Naval Academy participates in NCAA Division I in 30 varsity sports. It also fields teams in 12 club sports. The Academy is a non-football member of the Patriot League, a football-only member of the American Athletic Conference, and a member of the Collegiate Sprint Football League (men), Eastern Association of Rowing Colleges (men), Eastern Association of Women's Rowing Colleges, Eastern Intercollegiate Gymnastics League (men), and Eastern Intercollegiate Wrestling Association. Navy is also one of approximately 300 members of the Eastern College Athletic Conference (ECAC). Although the teams have no official name, they are usually referred to as "Navy", "Midshipmen", or "Mids".  The Academy competes in the following sports:

Varsity sports
Baseball – Men's
Basketball – Men's and women's
Crew (heavyweight) – Men's and women's
Crew (lightweight) – Men's and women's
Cross Country – Men's and women's
Football – Men's
Golf – Men's
Gymnastics – Men's
Lacrosse – Men's and women's
Rifle – Coeducational
Sailing (intercollegiate) – Coeducational
Sailing (offshore) – Coeducational
Soccer – Men's and women's
Sprint Football – Men's
Squash – Men's
Swimming & diving – Men's and women's

Tennis – Men's and women's
Track & Field (Indoor and Outdoor) – Men's and women's
Volleyball – Women's
Water Polo – Men's
Wrestling – Men's

Club sports
Boxing – Men's
Cycling – Coeducational
Hockey (ice) – Men's
Karate – Coeducational
Marathon – Coeducational
Pistol – Coeducational
Powerlifting – Coeducational
Rugby – Men's and women's
Softball – Women's
Triathlon – Coeducational
Volleyball – Men's

University of Maryland, Baltimore County

The University of Maryland, Baltimore County sports teams participate in the NCAA's Division I, and is member of the America East Conference.
The school's sports teams are called the Retrievers, and the mascot of the University is a Chesapeake Bay Retriever which has been referred to as both True Grit and Fever.

University of Maryland, College Park

The University of Maryland, College Park sports teams participate in NCAA Division I as a member of the Big Ten Conference. Prior to 2014, the school participated in Division I as a member of the Atlantic Coast Conference, of which it was a founding member. Its teams are called the Terrapins, and its mascot is a diamondback terrapin named Testudo.

NCAA Division II

Bowie State University

The Bowie State University athletic teams are members of the Central Intercollegiate Athletic Association.  Their teams are called the Bulldogs and compete in the following sports:
Basketball – Men's & Women's
Bowling – Women's
Cross Country – Men's & Women's
Football – Men's
Softbal – Women's
Track & Field (Indoor and Outdoor) – Men's & Women's
Volleyball – Women's

Frostburg State University
The Frostburg State Bobcats began a transition from Division III to Division II in July 2019, joining the Mountain East Conference. The Bobcats will be eligible for Division II national championships in the 2022–23 school year. The following sports are sponsored:
Baseball – Men's
Basketball – Men's & Women's
Cross Country – Men's & Women's
Field Hockey – Women's
Football – Men's
Lacrosse – Women's (plays in the East Coast Conference because the Mountain East sponsors lacrosse only for men)
Soccer – Men's & Women's
Softball – Women's
Swimming – Men's & Women's
Tennis – Men's & Women's
Track & Field (Indoor and Outdoor) – Men's & Women's
Volleyball – Women's

NCAA Division III

Goucher College
Goucher College athletic teams are members of the Landmark Conference. Their teams are called the Gophers and compete in the following sports:
Basketball – Men's & Women's
Cross Country – Men's & Women's
Equestrian – Women's
Field Hockey – Women's
Lacrosse – Men's
Soccer – Men's & Women's
Swimming – Men's & Women's
Tennis – Men's & Women's
Track & Field (Indoor and Outdoor) – Men's & Women's
Volleyball – Women's

Johns Hopkins University

Except for the men's and women's lacrosse teams, Johns Hopkins athletic teams are members of the Centennial Conference and compete in the following sports:
Baseball – Men's
Basketball – Men's & Women's
Crew – Men's & Women's
Cross Country – Men's & Women's
Fencing – Men's & Women's
Field Hockey – Men's
Football – Men's
Soccer – Men's & Women's
Swimming – Men's & Women's
Tennis – Men's & Women's
Track & Field (Indoor and Outdoor) – Men's & Women's
Volleyball – Women's
Water Polo – Men's & Women's
Wrestling – Men's

Hood College
Hood College's athletic teams are members of the Middle Atlantic Conferences.  Their teams are called the Blazers and compete in the following sports:
Basketball – Men's & Women's
Cross Country – Men's & Women's
Field Hockey – Women's
Golf – Men's & Women's
Lacrosse – Men's & Women's
Soccer – Men's & Women's
Softball – Women's
Swimming – Men's & Women's
Tennis – Men's & Women's
Track & Field  – Men's & Women's
Volleyball – Women's

McDaniel College
McDaniel College athletic teams are members of the Centennial Conference.  Their teams are called the Green Terror and compete in the following sports:
Baseball – Men's
Basketball – Men's & Women's
Cross Country – Men's & Women's
Field Hockey – Women's
Football – Men's
Golf – Men's and Women's
Lacrosse - Men's and Women's
Soccer – Men's & Women's
Softball – Women's
Swimming – Men's & Women's
Tennis – Men's & Women's
Track & Field (Indoor and Outdoor) – Men's & Women's
Volleyball – Women's
Wrestling – Men's

Notre Dame of Maryland University
Notre Dame athletic teams are members of the Colonial States Athletic Conference.  Their teams are called the Gators and compete in the following sports:
Basketball – Women's
Field Hockey – Women's
Lacrosse – Women's
Soccer – Women's
Softball – Women's
Swimming – Women's
Tennis – Women's
Volleyball – Women's

St. Mary's College of Maryland

St. Mary's College athletic teams are members of the Coast to Coast Athletic Conference, but will move to the North Eastern Athletic Conference after the 2020–21 school year. Their teams are called the Seahawks and compete in the following sports:
Baseball – Men's
Basketball – Men's & Women's
Field Hockey – Women's
Lacrosse – Men's
Sailing – Men's & Women's
Soccer – Men's & Women's
Swimming – Men's & Women's
Tennis – Men's & Women's
Softball – Women's
Volleyball – Men's & Women's

Salisbury University
Salisbury University athletic teams are members of the Coast to Coast Athletic Conference except for the football team, which plays in the Empire 8.  Their teams are called the Seagulls and compete in the following sports:
Baseball – Men's
Basketball – Men's & Women's
Cross Country – Men's & Women's
Football – Men's
Field Hockey – Women's
Lacrosse – Men's
Soccer – Men's & Women's
Softball – Women's
Swimming – Men's & Women's
Tennis – Men's & Women's
Track & Field – Men's & Women's
Volleyball – Women's

Stevenson University
Stevenson University athletic teams are members of the Eastern College Athletic Conference as well as the Middle Atlantic Conferences.  Their teams are called the Mustangs and compete in the following sports:
Baseball – Men's
Basketball – Men's & Women's
Cheer – Men's & Women's
Cross Country – Men's & Women's
Dance – Women's
Golf – Men's & Women's
Field Hockey – Women's
Football – Men's
Ice Hockey – Men's (2016–17) and Women's
Lacrosse – Men's
Soccer – Men's & Women's
Tennis – Men's & Women's
Softball – Women's
Volleyball – Men's & Women's

Washington College
Washington College athletic teams are members of the Centennial Conference, except for the sailing team which competes in the Middle Atlantic Intercollegiate Sailing Association.  Their teams are called the Shoremen/Shorewomen and compete in the following sports:
Baseball – Men's
Basketball – Men's & Women's
Field Hockey – Women's
Lacrosse – Men's & Women's
Rowing – Men's & Women's
Sailing  – CoEd
Soccer  – Men's & Women's
Softball – Women's
Swimming – Men's & Women's
Tennis – Men's & Women's
Volleyball – Women's

Collegiate Summer Baseball

Cal Ripken Collegiate Baseball League
The Cal Ripken Collegiate Baseball League (CRCBL) is a collegiate summer baseball league located in the Washington, D.C. metropolitan area.  Of the seven teams in the league, four play home games in Maryland.

MLB Draft League
The MLB Draft League is a collegiate summer baseball league that began play in 2021. Created by Major League Baseball (MLB) and Prep Baseball Report, the league serves as a showcase for top draft-eligible prospects leading up to each summer's MLB draft. The league's initial six teams were formerly members of Minor League Baseball's New York–Penn League, Eastern League, and Carolina League before MLB's reorganization of the minors for 2021.

High school

Baltimore Catholic League

The Baltimore Catholic League (BCL), is a competitive basketball association composed of private Catholic high schools in the Baltimore, Maryland geographic area.

St. Frances Academy
Calvert Hall College High School
Loyola Blakefield (originally Loyola High School)
St. Maria Goretti High School
The Cardinal Gibbons School (originally Cardinal Gibbons High School)
Archbishop Spalding High School
Mount Saint Joseph College (high school)

Interscholastic Athletic Association of Maryland

The Interscholastic Athletic Association of Maryland (or IAAM), established 1993, is a girls’ sports conference for parochial / private / independent high schools generally located in the Baltimore metropolitan area but extending to various other regions, including the state's mostly rural Eastern Shore.

 
Annapolis Area Christian School
Archbishop Spalding High School
Beth Tfiloh School
Bryn Mawr School
Chapelgate Christian Academy
Catholic High School of Baltimore 
Concordia Preparatory School
Friends School of Baltimore
Garrison Forest School
Glenelg Country School
Institute of Notre Dame
The John Carroll School
The Key School
McDonogh School
Mount Carmel School
Maryvale Preparatory School
Mercy High School
Mount de Sales Academy
Oldfields School
Notre Dame Preparatory School
Roland Park Country School
Park School of Baltimore
Severn School
Seton Keough High School
St. Frances Academy
Saint John's Catholic Prep (St. John's Literary Institution), Frederick
St. Mary's High School
St. Paul's School for Girls
St. Timothy's School
St. Vincent Pallotti High School
Towson Catholic High School

Maryland Interscholastic Athletic Association

The Maryland Interscholastic Athletic Association (or MIAA) established 1993, is a boys' sports conference for parochial / private / independent high schools generally located in the Baltimore metropolitan area but extending to various other regions, including the state's mostly rural Eastern Shore.

 
Annapolis Area Christian School
Archbishop Curley High School
Archbishop Spalding High School
Beth Tfiloh School
Boys' Latin School
Calvert Hall College High School
Cardinal Gibbons School
Chapelgate Christian Academy
Concordia Preparatory School
Friends School of Baltimore
Georgetown Preparatory School (Football Only)
Gilman School
Glenelg Country School
The John Carroll School
The Key School
Loyola Blakefield (formerly Loyola High School)
McDonogh School
Mount Saint Joseph College (high school)
Our Lady of Mount Carmel School
Park School of Baltimore
Severn School
St. Frances Academy
St. John's Prospect Hall
St. Mary's High School
St. Paul's School
St. Vincent Pallotti High School
Saints Peter & Paul High School
Towson Catholic High School

Maryland Public Secondary Schools Athletic Association

The Maryland Public Secondary Schools Athletic Association (MPSSAA) oversees public high school sporting contests in the state of Maryland.

Member High schools

Allegany County

Allegany High School, Cumberland
Mountain Ridge High School, Frostburg
Fort Hill High School, Cumberland

Anne Arundel County

Anne Arundel County Public Schools
Annapolis High School, Annapolis
Arundel High School, Gambrills
Broadneck High School, Annapolis
Chesapeake High School, Pasadena
Glen Burnie High School, Glen Burnie
Meade Senior High School, Fort Meade
North County High School, Glen Burnie
Northeast Senior High School, Pasadena
Old Mill High School, Millersville
Severna Park High School, Severna Park
South River High School, Edgewater
Southern High School, Harwood

Baltimore City

Baltimore City College, Baltimore
Baltimore Polytechnic Institute, Baltimore
Banks High School, Baltimore
Carver Vocational Technical High School, Baltimore
Doris M. Johnson High School, Baltimore
Paul Laurence Dunbar High School, Baltimore
Edmondson-Westside High School, Baltimore
Frederick Douglass Senior High School, Baltimore
Forest Park Senior High School, Baltimore
Lake Clifton/Eastern High School, Baltimore
Mergenthaler Vocational Technical High School, Baltimore
Northwestern High School, Baltimore
Patterson High School, Baltimore
Reginald F. Lewis High School, Baltimore
Dr. Samuel L. Banks High School, Baltimore
Southwestern High School, Baltimore
Walbrook High School, Baltimore
W. E. B. Dubois High School, Baltimore
Western High School, Baltimore

Baltimore County

Catonsville High School, Catonsville
Chesapeake High School, Essex
Dulaney High School, Timonium
Dundalk High School, Dundalk
Eastern Technical High School, Essex
Franklin High School, Reisterstown
Hereford High School, Parkton
Kenwood High School, Essex
Lansdowne Academy of Finance, Lansdowne
Loch Raven High School, Towson
Milford Mill Academy, Baltimore
Overlea High School, Baltimore
Owings Mills High School, Owings Mills
Parkville Center for Mathematics, Science, and Computer Science, Parkville
Patapsco High School, Dundalk
Perry Hall High School, Perry Hall
Pikesville High School, Pikesville
Randallstown High School, Randallstown
Sparrows Point High School, Sparrows Point
Towson Law & Public Policy High School (Towson High School), Towson
Western Technical High School, Catonsville
Woodlawn High School, Woodlawn

Calvert County

Huntingtown High School Huntingtown
Northern High School (Owings, Maryland)
Calvert High School (Prince Frederick, Maryland)
Patuxent High School Lusby

Caroline County

Colonel Richardson High School, Federalsburg
North Caroline High School, Ridgely

Carroll County

Century High School, Sykesville
Francis Scott Key High School, Union Bridge
Liberty High School, Eldersburg
Manchester Valley High School, Manchester
North Carroll High School, Hampstead
South Carroll High School, Sykesville
Westminster Senior High School, Westminster
Winters Mill High School, Westminster
Manchester Valley High School, Manchester

Cecil County

Elkton High School, Elkton
North East High School, North East
Perryville High School, Perryville
Rising Sun High School, Rising Sun

Charles County

Henry E. Lackey High School, Indian Head
La Plata High School, La Plata
Maurice J. McDonough High School, Pomfret
North Point High School, Waldorf
Thomas Stone High School, Waldorf
Westlake High School, Waldorf

Dorchester County
Cambridge-South Dorchester High School, Cambridge
North Dorchester High School, Hurlock

Frederick County
Brunswick High School, Brunswick
Catoctin High School, Thurmont
Frederick High School, Frederick
Governor Thomas Johnson High School, Frederick
Linganore High School, Frederick
Oakdale High School, Frederick 
Middletown High School, Middletown
Tuscarora High School, Frederick
Urbana High School, Urbana
Walkersville High School, Walkersville

Garrett County
Northern Garrett High School, Accident
Southern Garrett High School, Oakland

Harford County
Aberdeen High School, Aberdeen
Bel Air High School, Bel Air
C. Milton Wright High School, Bel Air
Edgewood High School, Edgewood
Fallston High School, Fallston
Harford Technical High School, Bel Air
Havre De Grace High School, Havre De Grace
Joppatowne High School, Joppa
Patterson Mill High School, Bel Air
North Harford High School, Pylesville

Howard County

Atholton High School, Columbia
Centennial High School, Ellicott City
Glenelg High School, Glenelg
Hammond High School, Columbia
Howard High School, Ellicott City
Long Reach High School, Columbia
Marriotts Ridge High School, Marriotsville
Mount Hebron High School, Ellicott City
Oakland Mills High School, Columbia
Reservoir High School, Fulton
River Hill High School, Clarksville
Wilde Lake High School, Columbia

Kent County

Kent County High School, Worton

Montgomery County

Albert Einstein High School, Kensington
Bethesda-Chevy Chase High School, Bethesda
Clarksburg High School, Clarksburg
Colonel Zadok A. Magruder High School, Rockville
Damascus High School, Damascus
Gaithersburg High School, Gaithersburg
James Hubert Blake High School, Silver Spring
John F. Kennedy High School, Silver Spring
Montgomery Blair High School, Silver Spring
Northwest High School, Germantown
Northwood High School, Silver Spring
Paint Branch High School, Burtonsville
Poolesville High School, Poolesville
Quince Orchard High School, Gaithersburg
Richard Montgomery High School, Rockville
Rockville High School, Rockville
Seneca Valley High School, Germantown
Sherwood High School, Sandy Spring
Springbrook High School, Silver Spring
Thomas Edison High School of Technology, Silver Spring
Thomas Sprigg Wootton High School, Rockville
Walt Whitman High School, Bethesda
Walter Johnson High School, Bethesda
Watkins Mill High School, Gaithersburg
Wheaton High School, Wheaton
Winston Churchill High School, Potomac

Prince George's County

Prince George's County Public Schools
Bladensburg High School, Bladensburg
Bowie High School, Bowie
Central High School, Capitol Heights
Crossland High School, Temple Hills
Frederick Douglass High School, Upper Marlboro
Forestville Military Academy, Forestville
DuVal High School, Lanham
Fairmont Heights High School, Capitol Heights
Charles Herbert Flowers High School, Springdale
Friendly High School, Fort Washington
Gwynn Park High School, Brandywine
High Point High School, Beltsville
Largo High School, Upper Marlboro
Laurel High School, Laurel
Northwestern High School, Hyattsville
Oxon Hill High School, Oxon Hill
Parkdale High School, Riverdale
Potomac High School, Oxon Hill
Eleanor Roosevelt High School, Greenbelt
Suitland High School, Forestville
Surrattsville High School, Clinton

Queen Anne's County

Kent Island High School, Stevensville
Queen Anne's County High School, Centreville

St. Mary's County

Chopticon High School, Morganza
Great Mills High School, Great Mills
Leonardtown High School, Leonardtown

Somerset County

Crisfield High School, Crisfield
Washington High School, Princess Anne

Talbot County

Easton High School, Easton
St. Michaels Middle/High School, St. Michaels

Washington County

Boonsboro High School, Boonsboro
Clear Spring High School, Clear Spring
Hancock High School, Hancock
North Hagerstown High School, Hagerstown
Smithsburg High School, Smithsburg
South Hagerstown High School, Hagerstown
Williamsport High School, Williamsport

Wicomico County

James M. Bennett High School, Salisbury
Mardela Middle and High School, Mardela Springs
Parkside High School, Salisbury
Wicomico High School, Salisbury

Worcester County

Pocomoke High School, Pocomoke City
Snow Hill High School, Snow Hill
Stephen Decatur High School, Berlin

Washington Catholic Athletic Conference

The Washington Catholic Athletic Conference or WCAC is a high school athletic league for boys, girls, and co-ed Catholic high schools located around and in Washington, D.C., United States.
Academy of the Holy Cross
Archbishop Carroll High School
Bishop Ireton High School
Bishop O'Connell High School
Bishop McNamara High School
DeMatha Catholic High School
Elizabeth Seton High School
Gonzaga College High School
Our Lady of Good Counsel High School
Paul VI Catholic High School
St. John's College High School
St. Mary's Ryken High School

Horse racing
Horse racing has a very long history in Maryland going back to colonial days.  The Preakness Stakes, the middle jewel in the Triple Crown, is run at Pimlico Race Course in Baltimore.  Presently, Maryland has four Thoroughbred tracks and two Harness Tracks.

See also
Maryland#Sports
List of sports venues in Maryland
List of athletes from Maryland A – M
List of athletes from Maryland N – Z
List of people from Maryland#Athletes

References

External links